Peltophorus is a genus of twig and stem weevils in the beetle family Curculionidae. There are at least two described species in Peltophorus.

Species
These two species belong to the genus Peltophorus:
 Peltophorus adustus (Fall, 1906) i b
 Peltophorus polymitus Boheman, 1845 i c b
Data sources: i = ITIS, c = Catalogue of Life, g = GBIF, b = Bugguide.net

References

Further reading

 
 
 

Curculionidae
Articles created by Qbugbot